Plymouth Civic Centre is a former principal administrative centre of Plymouth, Devon, England. Opened in 1962, the building was used by Plymouth City Council until it was sold for development in 2015. It has been Grade II Listed since 2007.

History

As part of the post-war plans to rebuild the city, Plymouth's Civic Centre was designed by city architect Hector Stirling. Although his design was approved in 1957, the architects Jellicoe, Ballantyne & Colleridge were given authority to make amendments to his design. As a result, some aspects of the centre was changed, but Stirling's general layout and concept remained.

In January 1958, excavation work commenced by Messrs Richard Costain. In August that year, Messrs Staverton Builders Ltd began the foundation and substructure work. The construction of the adjoining Council House began in November 1959 by Messrs Humphreys Ltd. Although financial problems raised concern over whether the tower building would be finished, the Civic Centre was completed in 1962. The building was handed over to the council, having cost £1,600,000 to build, on 21 March 1962. Queen Elizabeth II officially opened the building on 26 July 1962.

The Civic Centre became Plymouth's main administrative centre. For the first time, all of the city's municipal departments were housed together. Before the war, the council had used various offices throughout the city. By the 21st century, Plymouth City Council felt the building was becoming too expensive to maintain and inadequate for their needs. Plans to demolish the building were scrapped when the building became Grade II Listed in June 2007. The council then began looking at possible future uses for the building.

In 2013, plans for the tower to become a hotel were announced, with the Akkeron Group set to purchase the building. However, the purchase did not come to fruition and in 2015, the tower was eventually sold to developers Urban Splash for £1. In 2014, council staff began to vacate the building, with the last of the staff having left in 2015. The council has retained the adjacent Council House, while the tower awaits redevelopment. In January 2020 Urban Splash presented plans to convert the tower for residential use creating 144 apartments.

Design
The Civic Centre is a fourteen-storey tower block, with a 'butterfly' roof canopy and an attached two-storey block to the north. The tower housed the offices of the various municipal departments. The top storey of the tower was originally the Rooftop Restaurant, which was open to the public and closed in 1975. The adjoining two-storey building Council House has a number of committee rooms, a council chamber, reception room and the Lord Mayor's suite. The members' entrance to the Council House contains a mural depicting local scenes painted by Mary Adshead in 1962.

References

Buildings and structures in Plymouth, Devon
City and town halls in Devon
Buildings and structures completed in 1962
1962 establishments in England